Yeimy Paola Vargas Gómez (born 16 June 1983) is a Colombian beauty queen, actress and model who became Miss Colombia International 2003, Reina Internacional del Café 2004 and the third Colombian to win the title of Miss International 2004.

Filmography
 2017: Los Morales (Caracol Televisión) - Evelti Morales
 2013: La selección (Caracol TV) - Clarisa Galván
 2013: Allá te espero (RCN TV) - Dora
 2011: El Joe, la leyenda (RCN TV) - Adela Martelo

References

1983 births
Living people
Colombian female models
Miss International winners
People from Cartagena, Colombia
Miss International 2004 delegates
Colombian beauty pageant winners